Tomljanović is a Croatian surname.

It is one of the most common surnames in the Lika-Senj County of Croatia.

It may refer to:

 Ajla Tomljanović, Croatian-Australian tennis player

See also
 Tomljenović
 Tomić

References

Croatian surnames
Slavic-language surnames
Patronymic surnames